Brewster's Millions is a play written by Winchell Smith and Byron Ongley, based on the 1902 novel of the same name by George Barr McCutcheon. Producers Frederic Thompson and Elmer "Skip" Dundy staged it on Broadway in 1906. The play is about a young man who must spend a million dollars that he has inherited in order to inherit many millions more.

Broadway production

Thompson and Dundy previewed the play at the Taylor Opera House in Trenton, New Jersey, starting on October 11, 1906. It debuted on Broadway at the New Amsterdam Theatre on December 31, 1906. The production transferred to the Hudson Theatre on February 25, 1907, with the same cast.

The characters and cast from the Broadway production are given below:

Waltz

Australian composer Thomas Bulch published a waltz by the same name to coincide with a 1908 Australian tour of the play.

References

External links

 

1906 plays
Broadway plays
Comedy plays
English-language plays
American plays adapted into films
Plays based on novels